Norman Charles Cooper (12 July 1870 – 30 July 1920) was an English sportsman who represented the England national football team and played first-class cricket with Cambridge University.

Cooper was educated at Brighton College and Trinity Hall, Cambridge.

A wing-half, Cooper's only international cap came against Ireland at Perry Barr in the 1893 British Home Championship, with England winning 6–1.

Cooper was a right-handed opening batsman for Cambridge University at first-class cricket level and played 11 matches for them, one a combined team with Oxford. He also played a match for the CI Thornton's XI and in 1892 took the field for the HT Hewett's XII against Cambridge after he switched sides when his intended opponents revealed they had only 10 players.

References

External links
Cricinfo: Norman Cooper

1870 births
1920 deaths
English footballers
England international footballers
Cambridge University A.F.C. players
Corinthian F.C. players
English cricketers
Cambridge University cricketers
Oxford and Cambridge Universities cricketers
People educated at Brighton College
Alumni of Trinity Hall, Cambridge
Old Brightonians A.F.C. players
Association football wing halves
C. I. Thornton's XI cricketers